Club Sport Marítimo MH M, commonly known as Marítimo ( locally ), is a Portuguese sports club founded in Funchal, Madeira, in 1910. Marítimo is best known for its football team playing in Portugal's top-flight competition, the Primeira Liga. The club's reserve team, Marítimo B, compete in the fourth division, and the female team feature in the top-tier Campeonato Nacional Feminino. Aside from football, Marítimo have teams in other sports competing in national leagues, such as volleyball, handball, roller hockey and athletics. Marítimo supporters are called Maritimistas.

The club has won one major trophy, the Campeonato de Portugal, in 1926. After a long period without being able to participate in national championships they finally made their inaugural appearance in 1973. Since then, Marítimo have been present for 40 seasons in Primeira Liga, have been runners-up of the Taça de Portugal twice, runners-up of the Taça da Liga twice, and have participated nine times in the UEFA Cup/Europa League. The club have won the Segunda Divisão twice.

Marítimo's most recent foray into European competition came in 2018, though their best performance was during the 2012–13 season when they finished third in the group stage of the Europa League. The International Federation of Football History and Statistics (IFFHS) ranking lists Marítimo as the fifth best Portuguese club of this century; the highest ranking of any club from Madeira.

History

Marítimo was founded on 20 September 1910 as Club Português de Sport Marítimo, by Cândido Fernandes de Gouveia. The club adopted the red and green colours of the new Republican flag of Portugal to distinguish themselves from rivals Club Sports da Madeira, who used the blue and white colours of the old monarchy flag which had been replaced 15 days earlier. The name Marítimo, meaning Maritime in English, was used to reflect the fact that many of the team's players were workers of the nearby Funchal docks, a prominent employer at the time. The first ever match for Marítimo was a 2–1 win against Santa Clara, a select team composed of workers of the Western Telegraph Company. Soon after they began playing teams of sailors from visiting British ships. José Rodrigues Barrinhas, an old-fashioned attacking centre-half, made a name for himself in these games and in matches against rivals CS Madeira.

In 1921–22, the Portuguese clubs started playing a new national competition. The Campeonato de Portugal, played on a knock-out-basis (similar to the current Taça de Portugal), was the first national competition. After competing in the regional championships, the regional winners competed together to pick the Champion of Portugal. Marítimo make 13 appearances in the 17 editions of the competition. After several attempts, the club finally won the Campeonato de Portugal in 1925–26.  In the semi-final against Porto, Marítimo won by 7–1, and in the final against Belenenses Marítimo won by 2–0. It was after this great achievement that Marítimo was called "The Greatest of the Islands".

In the early 1930s, the club faced a serious financial crisis, although this did not affect its supremacy in the regional competitions. However, in 1934, a new national competition called Primeira Liga was created, in which teams outside the continental territory were excluded. Nevertheless, in 1938–39 the teams from the islands started to participate in the Taça de Portugal, after the champions of Madeira and Azores played a qualification round between themselves.
Being excluded from competing in the Primeira Liga, the club continued playing in regional competitions. It was in this period that Marítimo won many of the Regional Championships. In 1950, the team made an amazing tour of Africa in which they made some great achievements, raising high the name of the region.

After arduous negotiations with the Portuguese Football Federation, it was established that the winner in the regional championship of 1972–73 could play a qualifying round with the last of the Segunda Divisão and the first of the Terceira Divisão. Marítimo won that regional championship and started to participate in the national championships. They therefore became the first team from a Portuguese island to participate in the national championship. Maritimo's record of 35 Madeira Championships won between 1916 and 1973 still stands.

Marítimo was the first club outside continental territory to gain access to the First League in Portugal. Since then the club amassed 42 appearances so far in the higher tier of Portuguese football – being the 10th club with more appearances in the first league in its 88 editions. The consequences of long years without being able to compete regularly in national competitions were visible in the beginning. The fact that the island was not able to put teams in national competitions show the discrepancies in terms of infrastructures and organization between the regional and national reality. Yet the club in 1976–77 wins the II Divisão and rises to the Portuguese First Division, remaining there for over three seasons. Due to the existing semi-professionalism and some logistical difficulties, the club is relegated to Second Division in 1980–81, rising immediately next season, winning for the second time the II Divisão. However this rises and falls, after two seasons the club return to Primeira Liga in the 1982–83. Since then the club remains in the Primeira Liga consolidating is status of a team that compete to achieve a European competition.

Until the early 1990s, the club's best result was 9th in season 1987–88. The entry of a young coach of 35 years, the ambitious Brazilian Paulo Autuori, allied to greater internal organization, make that in 1991–92 the club reached the 7th place, staying just outside a possible European qualification. In the 1992–93 season lived up to the times called wonder-trio (Ademir, Edmilson and Jorge Andrade), betting on Autuori attractive football and with the third best attack of the League (56 goals). The qualification comes in the final round after a game against Boavista, with victory of Marítimo 3–2. In that same season is also important the home wins against Sporting CP (4–2) and against Gil Vicente (7–0). Again the club was a pioneer, being the first island team to achieve a qualification for a European event, under the 5th place achieved. Since then the club has been a constant presence in prominent places in the Portuguese championship, having consolidated its position of prominence.

In 1994–95, another great achievement was made when the club qualify to the final of the Taça de Portugal, after defeating Porto in the semi-finals by 1–0. Marítimo disputes the final against Sporting CP, losing by 2–0. Six years later, in 2000–01 season, Marítimo achieved the final again, after defeating Boavista in the semi-final by 1–0. This time Marítimo play the final against Porto, losing again by 2–0. However, Marítimo still remain the only club in Madeira that reached the final of Taça de Portugal.

Marítimo achieved a status of a club that fights every season to reach a European competition. As of the 2011–12 season, the club has played 32 campaigns at the top level of Portuguese football, where they have competed continuously since 1985–86. The best ever league finish was 5th place obtain in 1992–93, and since then they had finish another five times in that position. Also Marítimo in the recent years is often seen in the European competitions, where recently got his eighth appearance in the UEFA Cup/Europa League. In the 2012–13 season, Marítimo qualified for the first time for the group stage of the Europa League.

Colours and crest

Since the very beginning of the club's history, red and green have been the official colours. In 1910, the club adopted the red and green colours of the new Republican flag of Portugal to distinguish themselves from rivals Club Sports da Madeira, who used the blue and white colours of the old monarchy flag which had been replaced 15 days after the clubs foundation, following the 5 October 1910 revolution.

Although there is no date or author, the first crest clearly refers to the maritime origins of the club, which is stated in the paddle, the float, the harpoon, and the anchor. The ball in the badge represents the sport played in the club.

For the 1916–17 season, a new crest was created by José Inês Ramos, a designer at an Embroidery House in Funchal. The new crest maintains the maritime roots of the club, expressed in the ship's wheel. However a Lion was included in the new crest, which was to symbolize the strength of the new Champion of Madeira. Since then the crest has remained the same, with only some minor graphical changes over the years. The crest was updated again in 1999 to a modern version, following the formation of the SAD organisation, however the classic logo remained on the team jerseys until 2008. In 2022, the club announced the return of the classic crest, used from 1916 to 1999, as the primary logo.

Kit evolution

Kit sponsorship

Support
Marítimo are known throughout the Portuguese speaking world and have significant fan bases in the former Portuguese colonies of Brazil, Angola, and Cape Verde, as well as areas with significant Portuguese communities such as the Northeastern United States, Canada, the United Kingdom (specifically Jersey and London) and South Africa.

The club also has a big fans base in Venezuela, where sister club Marítimo de Venezuela of Caracas have won several national Championships. The club was founded in 1959 by Portuguese immigrants living in Caracas, who based their new club on their favourite team from back home in Madeira. Even today, strong ties are kept between both clubs and supporters from either side of the Atlantic Ocean. A similar situation is present in Cape Verde, where Marítimo do Porto Novo play in the same green and red stripes when competing in the Santo Antão Island League (South).

Closer to home, the club has a proud reputation of being one of the most supported clubs in Portugal after the "big three", and the most popular club on their home island of Madeira, outranking local rivals Nacional and União. The club has over 10,000 registered members (sócios) and three predominant groups of Ultras, the Esquadrão Maritimista, Ultras Templários  and Fanatics 1910.

There are several famous fans of Marítimo who have publicly declared their support for the team on various occasions, such as the multimillionaire businessman Joe Berardo and Madeira's Regional Governor, the controversial politician Alberto João Jardim.

The club was used a political vehicle in the 1970s during Madeira's fight for freedom and autonomy from mainland Portugal. Governor Jardim proclaimed his support of the club in order to gain votes and the backing from the people of Madeira, while the people in turn supported Marítimo as a symbol of their pride and allegiance to Madeira.

Stadium

Previously playing at the Campo do Almirante Reis until they moved out in 1935, Marítimo currently play their home games at the Estádio do Marítimo, the municipality stadium of Funchal. The stadium was originally built by rival club Nacional but came into the hands of the local Government after the club fell into a financial crisis. Although uniquely picturesque the stadium was rapidly aging, despite numerous face lifts over the years.

In October 2006, it was announced that the club would construct a new state-of-the-art stadium in the Praia Formosa area of West Funchal. However, after several delays and a political war over funding and planning, the stadium plans were put on hold indefinitely, adding to a list of set-backs that stretch well over a decade. The fact that archrivals Nacional were allowed to construct a new stand and training facility at their Estádio da Madeira (with government backing) angered Marítimo's fans even more.

A year later, on 14 September 2007, an agreement between the club's directors and the Madeiran government (of whom own a 40% share of the club) was reached to use the site of the current Estádio dos Barreiros as the location of a brand new, reconstructed commercial stadium. Work began on the new stadium on 20 July 2009, with the realigning of the pitch and demolition of the Bancada Nascente, reducing the capacity to 5,000 seats in the Bancada Central stand. Initial plans indicated that the stadium would be completed by 2011 but following the 2010 flooding disaster, the local government withdrew its funding and construction was halted. The club continued to use the stadium with only the Bancada Central (main stand) usable as the other three sides of the pitch were incomplete. On 25 March 2013, the club opened a new museum and club shop adjacent to the stadium.

After a four-year hiatus, the local government pledged €12 million towards the project and construction of the stadium resumed in May 2014. The initial work focused on finishing the three stands that had been left incomplete from the previous work and so a further reduction in capacity was made, bringing the number of usable seats to just 4,000. The new stands were finished and open to the public in January 2015, with the first game being played in front of 7,000 spectators on 18 January against Braga. The following week, demolition started on the main stand to make way for the completion of the stadium project. The current capacity of the stadium is 9,500, which will be boosted to 10,600 once the construction of the stands is complete (2 December).

The club also own the Campo da Imaculada Conceição, a small stadium in the north of Funchal. The land it stands on was purchased by supporters and donated to the club who thus constructed the stadium, which was officially inaugurated on 3 October 1965. Situated adjacent to the club's Complexo Desportivo, the ground is used for B team-matches and for training sessions.

Attendances
The attendances of Marítimo's home games were on a steady decline since the late 1990s, with the average attendance filling just half of the stadium's capacity for many seasons. The beginning of the work on the new stadium, on 20 July 2009, initially reduced capacity to 5,000 seats which also contributed to a decline of attendances. After opening three new stands in 2015 (7,200 seats) the attendances started to increase, reaching in 2016 a record attendance of the last sixteen years.

Honours

National
Campeonato de Portugal
Winners (1): 1925–26
Taça de Portugal
Runners-up (2): 1994–95, 2000–01
Taça da Liga
Runners-up (2): 2014–15, 2015–16
Segunda Divisão
Winners (2): 1976–77, 1981–82

Regional
AF Madeira Championship (Tier 4)
Winners (35) – Record: 1916–17, 1917–18, 1921–22, 1922–23, 1923–24, 1924–25, 1925–26, 1926–27, 1928–29, 1929–30, 1930–31, 1932–33, 1935–36, 1939–40, 1940–41, 1944–45, 1945–46, 1946–47, 1947–48, 1948–49, 1949–50, 1950–51, 1951–52, 1952–53, 1953–54, 1954–55, 1955–56, 1957–58, 1965–66, 1966–67, 1967–68, 1969–70, 1970–71, 1971–72, 1972–73
AF Madeira Cup
Winners (26) – Record: 1946–47, 1947–48, 1949–50, 1950–51, 1951–52, 1952–53, 1953–54, 1954–55, 1955–56, 1958–59, 1959–60, 1965–66, 1966–67, 1967–68, 1968–69, 1969–70, 1970–71, 1971–72, 1978–79, 1980–81, 1981–82, 1984–85, 1997–98, 2006–07, 2008–09, 2017–18

Players

Current squad

Other players under contract

Out on loan

Reserve and youth teams
For B-team players, see C.S. Marítimo B.
For Under-23 team players, see C.S. Marítimo Sub-23.
For youth team players, see C.S. Marítimo Juniors.

Notable players

Including only players with at least 100 appearances at the club, or who has appeared for their international team.

 Adelino Nunes
 António Oliveira
 Ariza Makukula
 Briguel
 Bruno Fernandes
 Carlos Jorge
 Daniel Kenedy
 Danilo Pereira
 Danny
 Dyego Sousa
 Eduardo Luís
 Fernando Santos
 Jorge Costa
 Jorge Silva
 José Ramos
 José Sá
 Nuno Valente
 Paulo Alves
 Paulo Madeira
 Pepe
 Pinga
 Rúben
 Vado
 Zeca 
 Djalma 
 Gevorg Ghazaryan
 Christian 
 Danilo Dias
 Edmilson 
 Kléber 
 Léo Lima 
 Manduca 
 Marcinho 
 Marcos
 Roberto Sousa 
 Serginho Chulapa 
 Souza
 Ilian Iliev
 Héldon Ramos 
 Alex Bunbury 
 Fernando Aguiar 
 Alex von Schwedler
 Abdel Sattar Sabry
 John Richards
 Lino 
 Nanu 
 Amir Abedzadeh
 Daizen Maeda 
 Moussa Marega 
 Mitchell van der Gaag 
 Moussa Maâzou 
 Sylvanus Okpala
 Colin Hill 
 Baba Diawara 
 Suk Hyun-Jun 
 Selim Benachour 
 Collins Mbesuma

Personnel

Coaching staff

Coaching history

Presidents

 Joaquim Pontes – (1910–13)
 Manuel Humberto Passos Freitas – (1910–13)
 César Marcelino Vieira – (1914–17)
 Pedro Auguesto Gouveia – (1917–21)
 Francisco Aquino Baptista Santos – (1921–22)
 Joaquim Quintino Travassos Lopes – (1922–27)
 António Felix Pita – (1927–28)
 Joaquim Quintino Travassos Lopes – (1928–30)
 Alváro Menezes Alves Reis Gomes – (1930–31)
 Jordão Menezes Azevedo – (1931–32)
 Amâncio Franco Olim Marote – (1932)
 Fernando Augusto Câmara – (1932–33)
 Jaime Elói Luis – (1933–34)
 José Marcos Freitas Morna – (1934–35)
 Álvaro Menezes Alves Reis Gomes – (1935–36)
 João Carlos de Sousa – (1936–39)
 Eduardo Ferreira T. S. Albergaria – (1939–40)
 João Gouveia Menezes – (1940–43)
 Amaro Magno Ferreira – (1943–45)
 João Carlos de Sousa – (1945–47)
 Manuel Rodrigues Gouveia – (1947–48)
 Carlos Sousa – (1948–50)
 João Carlos de Sousa – (1950–52)
 João Lemos Gomes – (1952–53)
 João Carlos de Sousa – (1953–54)
 Jaime Ornelas Camacho – (1954–55)
 João José Pita da Silva – (1955–59)
 Henrique Viera da Luz – (1959–68)
 Bacili Alcino Dionísio – (1968–73)
 José Miguel Jardim Olival Mendonça – (1973–78)
 Nicolau Alberto A. Drumond Borges – (1978–81)
 Manuel Honório Ferreira de Sousa – (1981–82)
 António Silva Henriques – (1982–88)
 Rui Emanuel Baptista Fontes – (1988–97)
 José Carlos Rodrigues Pereira – (1997–2021)
 Rui Emanuel Baptista Fontes – (2021–Present)

Statistics and records

Recent seasons

 Last updated: 21 May 2022
 Div = Division; Pos = Position in Primeira Liga; Pld = Played; W = Won; D = Drawn; L = Lost; GF = Goals for; GA = Goals against; Pts = Points
 TP = Taça de Portugal (Portuguese Cup); TL = Taça da Liga (Portuguese League Cup); UEL = UEFA Europa League
 R5 = Fifth round R4 = Fourth round; R3 = Third round; R2 = Second round; R1 = First round; PO = Play-off; GS = Group stage; R64 = Round of 64; R32 = Round of 32; R16 = Round of 16; QF = Quarter-finals; SF = Semi-finals; RU = Runners-up; W = Winners

European competition
Updated 24 August 2017.

Q = Qualification Round
PUC = Points UEFA Coefficient

UEFA club coefficient ranking
Updated 14 July 2017.

Other sports
Like many other Portuguese clubs, Marítimo operates several sports teams outside of the football team. Although they are most recognisably successful in professional volleyball (See Marítimo volleyball), the club also field a prominent handball team (See Marítimo handball), a National Championship-winning women's basketball team and a popular futsal team (See Marítimo futsal). Other sports groups within the organisation include athletics, figure skating, fishing, futsal, karate, kart racing, rallying, rhythmic gymnastics, roller hockey, rugby union and swimming.

See also
Madeira derby
C.S. Marítimo B
C.S. Marítimo C
C.S. Marítimo de Venezuela
C.S. Marítimo (futsal)
C.S. Marítimo (handball)
C.S. Maritimo (volleyball)

Notes

References

Bibliography

External links
  
 Maritimo Expat Fan Website

 
Football clubs in Portugal
Sport in Madeira
Multi-sport clubs in Portugal
Association football clubs established in 1910
1910 establishments in Portugal
Taça de Portugal winners
Primeira Liga clubs